Irving Kupcinet (July 31, 1912 – November 10, 2003) was an American newspaper columnist for the Chicago Sun-Times, television talk-show host, and radio personality based in Chicago, Illinois.  He was popularly known by the nickname "Kup".

His daily "Kup's Column" was launched in 1943 and remained a fixture in the Sun-Times for the next six decades.

Early life
Kupcinet was youngest of four children born to Russian Jewish immigrants in the North Lawndale neighborhood of Chicago. While attending Harrison Technical High School, he became editor of the school newspaper and the senior class president. He eventually won a football scholarship to Northwestern University, but a scuffle with another student led to his transferring to the University of North Dakota.

Career
Upon graduating college, Kupcinet was signed by the Philadelphia Eagles football team in 1935. 
His football career was cut short due to a shoulder injury, which led him to take a job as a sports writer for the Chicago Daily News in 1935.

While writing his sports column, Kupcinet also wrote a short "People" section which became officially known as "Kup's Column" in 1948, after The Chicago Sun and the Daily News merged to form the Chicago Sun-Times. "Kup's Column" chronicled the nightlife of Chicago, along with celebrity and political gossip. The column would eventually be distributed to more than 100 newspapers around the world.

In 1952, Kupcinet became a pioneer in the television talk show genre when he landed his own talk show. In 1957, he was one of the set of hosts who replaced Steve Allen on The Tonight Show, before Jack Paar was brought in to change the program's format. Kupcinet's own series ran from 1959 until 1986 and was, at one point, syndicated to over 70 stations throughout the United States. The series garnered 15 Emmy Awards along with a Peabody Award.

In addition to writing his newspaper column and talk-show hosting duties, from 1953 to 1977 Kupcinet provided commentary for radio broadcasts of Chicago Bears football games with Jack Brickhouse (and was affectionately mocked for the signature phrase, "Dat's right, Jack").

Film cameos
Kupcinet made cameo appearances in two films directed by Otto Preminger – 1959's Anatomy of a Murder and the 1962 drama Advise and Consent.

Awards and honors
In 1982, Kupcinet was elected to Chicago's Journalism Hall of Fame.

Published works
In 1988, Kupcinet published his autobiography, Kup: A Man, an Era, a City.

Personal life
Kupcinet met Esther "Essee" Solomon while she was a Northwestern student, and married her in 1939. The couple had two children; a daughter, Karyn in 1941, and a son, Jerry in 1944.

The Kupcinets' daughter, Karyn, moved to Hollywood in the early 1960s to pursue an acting career. On November 30, 1963, her nude body was found in her West Hollywood apartment. Her mysterious death, ruled to be a homicide by strangulation because  her hyoid bone had been broken, was never solved.  The Kupcinets established a theater named in her honor at Shimer College, then located in Mount Carroll, Illinois. Before the murder, Irv Kupcinet had been aware of his daughter’s close relationship with actor Andrew Prine, and the three of them had been photographed together at a public event in Los Angeles. Irv Kupcinet conferred with Los Angeles County Sheriff’s Department investigators and hired a private investigator, and he soon came to believe Prine had nothing to do with the murder. Sheriff’s Department investigators never made an arrest.

Irv Kupcinet’s wife Essee died in 2001; they were married for 62 years.

Death
On November 10, 2003, Kupcinet died from respiratory complications from pneumonia at Northwestern Memorial Hospital, in Chicago. He was 91 years old.

Filmography

See also
 Statue of Irv Kupcinet (2006), Chicago

References

External links

 
 
 
 

1912 births
2003 deaths
American columnists
American football quarterbacks
20th-century American memoirists
American people of Russian-Jewish descent
American television personalities
Chicago Bears announcers
Chicago Sun-Times people
Emmy Award winners
National Football League announcers
North Dakota Fighting Hawks football players
Northwestern Wildcats football players
Peabody Award winners
Philadelphia Eagles players
Players of American football from Illinois
Writers from Chicago